In dynamical systems, a branch of mathematics, an invariant manifold is a topological manifold that is invariant under the action of the dynamical system. Examples include the slow manifold, center manifold, stable manifold,  unstable manifold, subcenter manifold and inertial manifold.

Typically, although by no means always, invariant manifolds are constructed as a 'perturbation' of an invariant subspace about an equilibrium.
In dissipative systems, an invariant manifold based upon the gravest, longest lasting modes forms an effective low-dimensional, reduced, model of the dynamics.

Definition
Consider the differential equation 
Alternatively, the orbit
In addition,  is called an invariant manifold if  is a manifold.

Examples

Simple 2D dynamical system

For any fixed parameter , consider the variables  governed by the pair of coupled differential equations

The origin is an equilibrium.  This system has two invariant manifolds of interest through the origin.  
 The vertical line  is invariant as when  the -equation becomes  which ensures  remains zero.  This invariant manifold, is a stable manifold of the origin (when ) as all initial conditions  lead to solutions asymptotically approaching the origin.
 The parabola  is invariant for all parameter . For  this parabola is the unstable manifold of the origin. For  this parabola is a center manifold, more precisely a slow manifold, of the origin.
 For  there is only an invariant stable manifold about the origin, the stable manifold including all .

Invariant manifolds in non-autonomous dynamical systems

A differential equation  

In the extended phase space  of such a system, any initial surface  generates an invariant manifold 

A fundamental question is then how one can locate, out of this large family of  invariant manifolds, the ones that have the highest influence on the overall system dynamics. These most influential invariant manifolds in the extended phase space of a non-autonomous dynamical systems are known as  Lagrangian Coherent Structures.

See also
 Hyperbolic set
 Lagrangian coherent structure
 Spectral submanifold

References

Dynamical systems